Good Gravy is a live album by saxophonist Teddy Edwards recorded at the Bimhuis in 1981 and released on the Timeless label.

Reception 

In his review for AllMusic, Scott Yanow stated "This obscure live CD features the underrated tenor saxophonist Teddy Edwards in top form stretching out on three standards ... Edwards builds up his solos expertly and plenty of sparks fly. Recommended".

Track listing 
 "Oh, Lady Be Good!" (George Gershwin, Ira Gershwin) – 14:48
 "Oleo"  (Sonny Rollins) – 5:53
 "Georgia" (Hoagy Carmichael, Stuart Gorrell) – 10:47
 "Good Gravy"  (Teddy Edwards) – 9:01

Personnel 
Teddy Edwards – tenor saxophone
Rein de Graaff – piano
Henk Haverhoek – bass
John Engels – drums

References 

1982 live albums
Teddy Edwards live albums
Timeless Records live albums